Herman Hartwich (or Hartwick, July 8, 1853 in New York City – March 8, 1926 in Munich) was a German-American landscape and genre painter.

Allgemeines Künstlerlexikon called him a figure painter; painter; landscape painter; animal painter. Herringshaw's American Blue Book of Biography mentions him as a painter and engraver.

Hartwich studied painting from 1881 to 1885 at Academy of Fine Arts, Munich, since 1883 he exhibited his works in Munich. In the catalogs of art exhibitions in Munich Glass Palace Hartwich can be found in 1883, 1888,:1889, 1890 and 1891 catalogs.

Hartwich took part in six Parisian art salons, where he won in 1892 a price. He returned in 1894 to New York home, but came later again to Munich, where he died in 1926.

References 
Emmanuel Bénézit: Dictionary of Artists 2006 
Artnet Gallery
Smithsonian American Art Museum

Notes 

19th-century German painters
19th-century American male artists
German male painters
Landscape painters
Genre painters
1853 births
1926 deaths
19th-century American painters
American male painters
20th-century American painters
20th-century German painters
20th-century American male artists